NICF may refer to:
 Northern Ireland Cycling Federation
 Maleamate amidohydrolase, an enzyme